Sigríður Þorsteinsdóttir (1841 – 1924) was an Icelandic editor and publisher.

She founded, managed and published the monthly women's magazine Framsókn, in collaboration with her daughter Ingibjörg Skaptadóttir, between 1895 and 1899.  The magazine was the first women's magazine in Iceland, placed focus on women's access to education and encouraged women to demand and use their rights.  She and her daughter belonged to the first female editors, publishers and journalists on Iceland. She retired in 1899 and left her magazine to Jarþrúður Jónsdóttir and Ólafía Jóhannsdóttir.

References 

1841 births
1924 deaths
19th-century Icelandic people
19th-century Icelandic women
Icelandic journalists
19th-century journalists
Icelandic editors
Icelandic women editors
Icelandic women in business
Icelandic publishers (people)